Longtan National Speedway is a Taiwanese motor racing circuit located in Longtan, Taoyuan County.

It is managed by the Chinese Taipei Motor Sports Association (CTMSA).

References
 

Motorsport venues in Taiwan
Buildings and structures in Taoyuan City
Tourist attractions in Taoyuan City